Sânpaul may refer to several places in Romania:

 Sânpaul, Cluj, a commune in Cluj County
 Sânpaul, Mureș, a commune in Mureș County
 Sânpaul, a village in Șofronea Commune, Arad County
 Sânpaul, a village in Mărtiniș Commune, Harghita County